The John Gilmary Shea Prize is an annual award given by the American Catholic Historical Association for the most original and distinguished contribution to knowledge of the history of the Catholic Church. Established in 1945, it is named in honor of the nineteenth-century Catholic historian John Gilmary Shea.

Past Shea Prize awardees include the following:
 2020: Elizabeth Foster, African Catholic: Decolonization and the Transformation of the Church
 2019: Karin Vélez, The Miraculous Flying House of Loreto: Spreading Catholicism in the Early Modern World
 2018: Michelle Armstrong-Partida, Defiant Priests Domestic Unions, Violence, and Clerical Masculinity in Fourteenth-Century Catalunya
 2017: William B. Taylor, Theater of a Thousand Wonders: History of Miraculous Images and Shrines in New Spain
 2016: Katrina B. Olds, Forging the Past: Invented Histories in Counter-Reformation Spain
 2015: Maureen C. Miller, Clothing the Clergy: Virtue and Power in Medieval Europe, c. 800-1200
 2014: John W. O'Malley, Trent: What Happened at the Council
 2013: Charles Keith, Catholic Vietnam: A Church from Empire to Nation
 2012: John Connelly, From Enemy to Brother: The Revolution in Catholic Teaching on the Jews, 1933-1965
 2011: Ulrich L. Lehner, Enlightened Monks: The German Benedictines, 1740-1803
 2010: Neal Pease, Rome’s Most Faithful Daughter: The Catholic Church and Independent Poland 1914 – 1939
 2009: John Van Engen, Sisters and Brothers of the Common Life: The Devotio Moderna and the World of the Later Middle Ages

See also
 List of history awards

References

External links
John Gilmary Shea Prize

American history awards
History of Catholicism in the United States